Mehoopany may refer to the following places in Pennsylvania:

Mehoopany Creek, a tributary of the North Branch Susquehanna River in Sullivan and Wyoming Counties
Mehoopany Township, Wyoming County
Mehoopany, Pennsylvania
North Mehoopany, Pennsylvania